David Korčián (born 3 April 1986) is a Czech footballer, who plays as a forward. He currently plays for 1. HFK Olomouc.

External links
 

1986 births
Living people
Czech footballers
Czech First League players
SFC Opava players
1. HFK Olomouc players

Association football forwards